Heartfall Arises is a Chinese-Hong Kong suspense crime action drama film directed by Ng Ban-yu and starring Nicholas Tse, Sean Lau, Tong Liya, Mavis Fan and Vengo Gao. It was scheduled for release in Hong Kong on October 20, 2016 and in China on October 21, 2016 in 4DX, 3D and China Film Giant Screen.

Plot
Heartfall Arises follows two Chinese chess masters who have been entangled in several serial murder cases in relation to the effect of organ transplants. John Ma (Nicholas Tse) a brave cop, and Calvin Che (Sean Lau) a criminal psychologist brought together are under the great threat and struggle to define all means evolved from the killings. Their final confrontation will uncover the lead behind the scene but will also put numerous innocent people in great danger than it is ever known before.

Cast
Nicholas Tse
Sean Lau
Tong Liya
Mavis Fan
Vengo Gao

References

External links

Hong Kong crime films
2016 action drama films
Hong Kong action films
Hong Kong drama films
2016 crime action films
2016 crime drama films
Hong Kong 3D films
2016 3D films
4DX films
Tianjin Maoyan Media films
2010s Hong Kong films